Anthony Calvert (1735–1809) was an English entrepreneur of the eighteenth century particularly noted for his activity as a slave trader. He was a partner of Camden, Calvert and King, one of the most prominent slave trading enterprises in London. They imported tea from China and cotton from India. He also became involved in the transportation of English convicts first to Africa and later to Australia.

The partnership was also involved in South Sea whaling late in the 18th century. The firm had at least six vessels active in the trade in the years between 1782 and 1796. They were also supporters of the West India Dock Company.

Calvert first made several voyages from the early 1760s along slave trade routes before buying and becoming master of the Charlotte in 1766. By 1773 he went into business with Thomas King with whom he took joint command of the Three Good Friends.

Citations

References
 

English slave traders
1735 births
British people in whaling
1809 deaths
18th-century English businesspeople